The 1990 Barber Saab Pro Series season was the fifth season of the series. All drivers used Saab powered Goodyear shod Mondiale chassis. Rob Wilson won the championship. Wilson was the first non-American to win the Barber Saab Pro Series.

Race calendar and results

Final standings

References

Barber Dodge Pro Series
Barber Saab Pro